50 Squadron or 50th Squadron may refer to:

 50 Squadron, former designation of the 201 Squadron, Portugal
 50 Squadron SAAF, a unit of the South African Air Force
 No. 50 Squadron RAF, a unit of the United Kingdom Royal Air Force

United States
50th Airlift Squadron
50th Education Squadron
50th Fighter-Bomber Squadron
50th Flying Training Squadron
50th Military Airlift Squadron
50th Operations Support Squadron, 50th Operations Group
50th Space Communications Squadron

See also
50th Wing (disambiguation)